This is a list of English composers from the Baroque period in alphabetical order:

 Charles Avison (1709–1770) 
 John Banister (c. 1624/1630–1679)
 John Baston (fl. 1708–1739)
 John Blow (1649–1708)
 William Boyce (1711-1779)
 Thomas Brewer (1611–c. 1660)
 Richard Browne (fl 1614–1629) 
 Richard Browne (c.1630–1664) 
 Richard Browne (d. 1710) 
 Albertus Bryne (1621–1668)
 Richard Carter (fl 1728–1757)
 William Child (1606–1697)
 Jeremiah Clarke (1674–1707)
 Thomas Clayton (1673–1725)
 Henry Cooke (1615–1672)
 William Corbett (1680–1748)
 William Croft (1678–1727)
 Richard Davis (died 1688) 
 Giovanni Battista Draghi (c. 1640–1708)
 Henry Eccles (1670–1742)
 John Eccles (1668–1735)
 John Galliard (1687–1749)
 John Gamble (fl. from 1641, died 1687)
 Christopher Gibbons (1615–1676)
 Maurice Greene (1696–1755)
 George Frideric Handel (1685–1759)
 Pelham Humfrey (1647–1674)
 John Jenkins (1592–1678)
 Richard Jones (late 17th century–1744)
 Richard Justice (died 1757)
 Nicholas Lanier (1588–1666)
 Henry Lawes (1595–1662)
 William Lawes (1602–1645)
 Matthew Locke (1621–1677)
 Thomas Mace (c. 1613–1709?)
 Richard Mico (1590–1661)
 Johann Christoph Pepusch (1667–1752)
 John Playford (1623–1686/7)
 Daniel Purcell (1664–1717)
 Henry Purcell (1659–1695)
 John Ravenscroft (c. 1650?–1708)
 Thomas Roseingrave (1688–1766)
 Christopher Simpson (c. 1602/1606–1669)
 Thomas Tudway (c. 1656–1726)
 William Turner (1651–1740)
 Robert Valentine (c. 1671–1747)
 William Webb (c. 1600–after 1656)
 John Weldon (1676–1736)
 John Wilson (1595–1674)
 Michael Wise (1647–1687)
 Robert Woodcock (c. 1690–1728)

Notes

See also
 Early music of the British Isles
 Chronological list of English classical composers
 List of Baroque composers
 List of English Renaissance composers

English
Baroque